The girls' ice hockey tournament at the 2016 Winter Youth Olympics was held from 12 to 21 February at the Kristins Hall and the Youth Hall in Lillehammer, Norway.

Preliminary round
All times are local (UTC+1).

Playoff round

Bracket

Semifinals

Bronze medal game

Gold medal game

References

Youth
Girls' tournament